The 2011 Toyota Racing Series was the seventh running of the Toyota Racing Series. The Toyota Racing Series is New Zealand's premier open-wheeler motorsport category.

Defending champion Mitch Evans of Giles Motorsport retained both his International Trophy and main series titles, joining Daniel Gaunt as the only drivers to have won the Series on more than one occasion, after enjoying a successful championship campaign. Evans took seven race victories – including becoming the youngest-ever winner of the New Zealand Grand Prix – and fourteen podium finishes out of a possible fifteen races. Evans clinched both championship titles at Manfield after his closest rival at the time, Scott Pye elected not to attend the final meeting of the season at Taupo due to testing commitments in Europe. Pye fell to fourth in the championship standings after strong weekends for Nick Cassidy and Jamie McNee allowed them to overhaul Pye's points tally.

Cassidy, another Giles Motorsport driver, finished as top rookie after taking the round victory at Taupo which included his first two race wins in the Series, and he also took five further podium finishes as he finished 168 points behind Evans. McNee, in his second season in the championship, took his first race victories, winning at Timaru and Hampton Downs as well as a second place at Taupo to finish 47 points clear of Pye. Russian driver Daniil Kvyat finished the best of the five European drivers in the series, finishing in fifth place for Victory Motor Racing with a solitary victory at Manfeild. Two other drivers won races during the season, Russia's Ivan Lukashevich, like fellow countryman Kvyat won at Manfeild, and Britain's Alex Lynn won at Teretonga.

Teams and drivers

Calendar
The first four rounds were part of the International Trophy.

Results

Championship standings

Scoring system

Drivers' Championship

References

External links
Official website of the Toyota Racing Series

Toyota Racing Series
Toyota Racing Series
2011 in formula racing